This article is about the culture of natives of the Indian state of Jharkhand. The state of Jharkhand is located in the eastern part of the country and is known for its vivid culture, distinct paintings, traditions and festivals.

Languages 
Hindi is official language of Jharkhand. There are many regional and tribal languages in Jharkhand.

The regional languages that belong to the Indo-Aryan branch; in Jharkhand, they are Khortha, Nagpuri, and  Kudmali spoken by the Sadan, the Indo-Aryan ethnic groups of Chotanagpur. Other Indo-Aryan languages include Bhojpuri, Magahi, Maithili, Bengali, and Odia. The languages that belong to the Austroasiatic branch are Mundari, Santali, Bhumij and 
Ho. The languages that belong to the Dravidian language family are
Kurukh and Malto.

Cuisine

The staple foods in Jharkhand are rice, dal, vegetables, and tubers. Some dishes include Chilka Roti, Malpua, Dhooska, Arsa roti, and Pitha. Rugra (a type of mushroom) and bamboo shoots are also used as vegetables. The leaves of the Munga tree (Moringa oleifera) and the Koinar tree (Bauhinia variegata)  are used as leafy vegetables or Saag.

Local alcoholic drinks are Handia made from rice and Mahua daru made from flowers of the Mahua tree.

Festivals

Karam

Karam is a major native harvest festival of Jharkhand. It is celebrated on the 11th day of a full moon of the month of Bhado by the Sadan (Khortha, Nagpuri, Kurmali-speaking ethnic group) and the tribal (Munda, Bhumij, and Oraon) people of Jharkhand. During this festival, people bring branches of the Karam tree to the village and then place them on the ground. The branches are washed with milk and handia, and decorated with garlands, curd, rice, flowers and grains. The village priest "Pahan" offer sacrifice of Karam devta for good harvest.

Jitia

During the festival of Jitia, mothers fast for the well being of their children. It is celebrated from the seventh to the ninth lunar day of Krishna-Paksha, in the month of Ashwin.

Nawakhani
Nawakhani is an important festival that occurs in Jharkhand. During this festival, grains are eaten following the harvest.

Sohrai/Bandna

Sohrai is a cattle festival of Jharkhand's. It is celebrated during the Amavasya of the month of Kartik. It coincides with the Diwali festival. People fast throughout the day, and bathe their cattle. In the evening, sacrifices are offered to the cattle deity.

Holi
Phaguwa, or Holi, is the spring festival which falls in the month of Phalgun. In spring, people collect sal flower blossoms and place them on their roofs. There are special songs and dances for this festival.

Other festivals
Other festivals include  Tusu, Dussehra, Sarhul, Baha and Sendra parha festivals.

Folk dances

There are several folk dances in Jharkhand, including Jhumair, Domkach, Lahasua, Vinsariya, Jhumta, Fagua, Firkal, Painki, and Chhau.

Jhumair: Being a popular folk dance in Jharkhand, it is performed during harvest and festival season in which people hold hands and dance in circles. It is folk dance of Sadan, native Indo-Aryan ethnic groups of Jharkhand. The musical instruments used in this festival include Mandar, Dhol, Bansi, Nagara, Dhak, Shehnai, and Khartal. There are varieties to this dance, such as Khortha Jhumair, Nagpuri Jhumair, and Kurmali Jhumair. The Nagpuri version also have Mardani Jhumar and Janani Jhumar as varieties.
Domkach: A Nagpuri folk dance performed by the family of the bridegroom on the occasion of marriage. The theme of the songs carried in this dance is satirical.
Paiki: Also known as Paika is a nagpuri martial dance performed by men wearing ghungroos. The dance is composed of sword and shield carrying accompanied by music played on the Nagara, Dhak, and Shehnai.
Chhau dance: A semi-classical dance with martial, tribal, and folk traditions. Seraikella Chhau is found in Seraikella district of Jharkhand.
Mundari dance: A dance performed by the Munda tribe during harvest and festival season.
Santali dance: A dance performed by the Santal tribe during harvest and festival season.

Musical instruments used include Mandar, Dholki, Bansi,  Nagara, Dhak, Shehnai, Khartal, and Narsinga, among others.

Paintings

Sahrai painting is performed during the Sohrai festival. Various designs are painted in courtyards and on walls.

Tattoo
The local tattoo tradition of Godna is an essential part of local tradition.

Cinema 

Jharkhand produces many films in regional languages, including Nagpuri, Khortha, Santali, Ho, and Kurukh. The first feature film of Jharkhand was Aakarant, made under the banner of Drishyantar International in 1988. The first Nagpuri film was Sona Kar Nagpur (1994), produced and directed by Dhananjay Nath Tiwari.

References